Wilson is a subway station on Line 1 Yonge–University in Toronto, Ontario, Canada. It is located in the median of Allen Road at Wilson Avenue. Wi-Fi service is available at this station.

History
Wilson Station was opened in what was then the Borough of North York as the last station in the 1978 subway line extension north from St. George Station. According to historian Mike Filey, Wilson Avenue is a misspelling of Arthur L. Willson, who was a clerk and treasurer of York Township for over twelve years around 1875. Among Arthur Willson's accomplishments were writing a "municipal manual", "which has been found of practical value as a guide to those requiring a knowledge of municipal law", according to a history of the County of York.

Concurrent with the opening of the Toronto–York Spadina Subway Extension (TYSSE) on 17 December 2017, this station became one of the first eight stations to discontinue sales of legacy TTC fare media (tokens and tickets), previously available at a fare collector booth. Presto vending machines were available to sell Presto cards and to load funds onto them. On 3 May 2019, this station became one of the first ten stations to sell Presto tickets via Presto vending machines.

In November 2018, construction began on three new elevators, automatic sliding doors, and a new accessible washroom, to make the station wheelchair accessible. It was completed on 18 December 2020.

By the late 1990s, over 2,000 commuter parking spaces were available. Two lots were declared surplus in 2013 and have been redeveloped. , 953 parking spaces remain at Wilson, however the city government reached an agreement with developer Tridel in October 2021 to build 1,484 new homes, a childcare centre and a new park on the main parking lot. Following the opening of the subway extension into York Region in 2017, new commuter parking lots are available farther north at stations like Highway 407 and Pioneer Village.

Architecture and art

The subway station building is a simple enclosed concrete structure built within the median of Allen Road where it crosses over Wilson Avenue. The mezzanine level connects by a maze of tunnels to the bus terminal, a kiss-and-ride facility and four commuter parking lots with a total of 2257 spaces. An additional island bus platform, no longer needed for the reduced number of connecting buses after the line was extended to Sheppard West Station, was mothballed and now serves as a storage area.

Wilson station is home to multiple art displays. A wall sculpture by Ted Bieler entitled Canyons is located at the mezzanine level. In late 2019, Outside the Lines was installed in multiple parts of the station. The display can be found in various locations, such as the subway platform level, walkway to bus bays, and on the second floor of the bus bays. 

In October 2021, a mural named Daily Migration was unveiled. The mural is located on a wall of an entrance south of the station, west of Allen Road.

Subway infrastructure in the vicinity

Northwest of the station is the Wilson Yard, opened in 1977, which houses the system's largest subway marshalling yard having taken over Yonge-University line operations from Davisville Yard in 1993 and a large bus garage servicing most of the bus routes in north Toronto. The original yard access tracks form part of the mainline north to  station, crossing under the southbound lanes of Allen Road and descending, as does the road itself, down to ground level. There is a diamond crossover south of the station, widely used to reverse trains when the station was a terminus, and still frequently used for short turning.

Nearby landmarks
Nearby landmarks include a Costco and the southern end of Downsview Park. Large events at the park, such as World Youth Day 2002 and Molson Canadian Rocks for Toronto in 2003, have resulted in heavy use of Wilson station.

Tenants
 Donut shop
 Lottery booth
 Gateway Newstands

Surface connections 

TTC routes serving the station include:

During the early morning, the following routes from Sheppard West station also operate to/from Wilson station.

References

External links

Wilson Complex

Line 1 Yonge–University stations
Railway stations in Canada opened in 1978
Railway stations in highway medians